Scorpio is a genus of scorpions belonging to the family Scorpionidae. The species in this genus are found in northern Africa and western Asia.

Species
Scorpio was regarded as a monotypic genus for a long time, containing one widespread and highly variable species, S. maurus, which had many subspecies. It has since been recognised that within S. maurus sensu lato there were a number of taxa which should be regarded as valid species and new species have been described from sub-Saharan Africa:

 Scorpio birulai Fet, 1997
 Scorpio fuliginosus (Pallary, 1928)
 Scorpio hesperus Birula, 1910
 Scorpio maurus Linnaeus, 1758
 Scorpio mogadorensis Birula, 1910
 Scorpio niger Lourenço & Cloudsley-Thompson, 2012
 Scorpio punicus Fet, 2000
 Scorpio occidentalis Werner, 1936
 Scorpio savanicola Lourenço, 2009 
 Scorpio sudanensis Lourenço & Cloudsley-Thompson, 2009
 Scorpio weidholzi Werner, 1929

References

Scorpionidae
Scorpion genera